Jay Herford (born August 22, 1987 in Crofton, Maryland) is an American soccer player who currently plays for Crystal Palace Baltimore in the USSF Division 2 Professional League.

Career

College
Herford attended South River High School, and was a two-year starter at Frostburg State University, helping FSU to a 26-14-2 overall record during that time. He was an All-Allegheny Mountain Collegiate Conference Honorable Mention pick in 2007 and an All-Conference Second Team selection in 2008. He finished his senior season ranked second in the league in goals against average (0.77), third in save percentage (.797) and ninth in saves (59).

Professional
Herford turned professional in 2009 when he signed for the Harrisburg City Islanders of the USL Second Division. He made his professional debut - ironically, as an outfield player instead of a goalkeeper - on August 12, 2009 as a late substitute in Harrisburg's final regular season game of the 2009 season against Western Mass Pioneers.

Herford signed for Crystal Palace Baltimore of the USSF Division 2 Professional League as backup to first choice keeper Evan Bush.

References

External links
Harrisburg City Islanders bio
Frostburg bio

1987 births
Living people
American soccer players
Penn FC players
Crystal Palace Baltimore players
USL Second Division players
People from Crofton, Maryland
Association football goalkeepers